was a town located in Hioki District, Kagoshima Prefecture, Japan.

As of 2003, the town had an estimated population of 24,175 and the density of 433.01 persons per km². The total area was 55.83 km².

On May 1, 2005, Ijūin, along with the towns of Fukiage, Higashiichiki and Hiyoshi (all from Hioki District), was merged to create the city of Hioki and no longer exists as an independent municipality.

External links
 Official website of Hioki 

Dissolved municipalities of Kagoshima Prefecture